Hawkesbury Radio 89.9 (call sign: 2VTR) community radio stations in the Hawkesbury.

Hawkesbury Radio's primary purpose is to serve the residents of the Australian City of Hawkesbury,  Hawkesbury Radio broadcasts on the frequency 89.9 FM. The station is staffed by volunteers Hawkesbury Radio was the only Community Radio Station in Australia to have Broadcast rights of NRL which featured Penrith Panthers NRL matches, from 1997 to 2009. In 2016 the station gained broadcast rights to Western Sydney Wanderers A-League matches as well as W-League, National Youth League and FFA Cup matches involving the Wanderers

Hawkesbury Radio began in 1978 with a test broadcast, gaining its full licence in 1982, one of the first local community radio licences granted.  The station broadcast out of a tiny condemned building, which housed the studio and transmitter on Fitzgerald Street Windsor for many years, before moving to its current site in 1992 in an adjacent building.  Hawkesbury Radio originally broadcast on 89.7 MHz, but moved to its current frequency of 89.9 MHz in December 1999.

Loss of licence

In August 2017, Australian Communications Media Authority (ACMA) decided not to renew Hawkesbury Radio's fulltime permanent licence following many years of non compliance of licence conditions including maintaining/ensuring community participation.

Programming

Hawkesbury Radio keeps to a mainly AOR mix during the daytime hours. Outside of these hours, there are specialist programmes such as bluegrass, country and western music. The station also has sports programmes  on Fridays, Saturdays and Sundays.

Sports coverage

For 20 years it has broadcast various live events from calling Penrith Panthers NRL Matches from 1997-2009 and the club's reserve grade matches, to covering Windsor Wolves Ron Massey Cup Matches. Plus finals matches in NSWRL Competitions.

From 2016, the station has become the community radio partner of the Western Sydney Wanderers, with all A-League games covered on radio and all home games of the W-League and Youth League games online. The station also broadcasts the National Premier Leagues NSW competition each week in divisions 1, 2 & 3.

In addition the station became the first in Australia to broadcast a World Rugby Sevens Series event in broadcasting all three days of the 2017 Sydney Sevens, and the station also broadcasts at least one game a week in the Shute Shield Sydney club rugby competition after previously broadcasting Penrith Emus games from 2001-2003.

References

External links

Radio stations in New South Wales
Community radio stations in Australia
Radio stations established in 1978
1978 establishments in Australia